Alexander or Alex Meyer may refer to:

Alexander Meyer (footballer, born 1983), German former football defender
Alex Meyer (swimmer) (born 1988), American former open water and long-distance swimmer
Alex Meyer (baseball) (born 1990), American former professional baseball pitcher
Alexander Meyer (footballer, born 1991), German football goalkeeper
Bertie Alexander Meyer (1877–1967), British theatre producer and entrepreneur

See also
Alexander Mayer (disambiguation)
Alexander Meier (born 1983), German footballer